The New Brunswick Museum, located in Saint John, New Brunswick, is Canada's oldest continuing museum. The New Brunswick Museum was incorporated as the "Provincial Museum" in 1929 and received its current name in 1930, but its history goes back much further. Its lineage can be traced back another 88 years to 1842 and to the work of Dr. Abraham Gesner.

History

On 5 April 1842 Abraham Gesner opened the Museum of Natural History, the precursor of the New Brunswick Museum, in one room of the Mechanics' Institute on Carleton Street, in Saint John. Income from his newly founded museum was not enough to solve Gesner's financial problems. In 1843, his collection passed on to his creditors who, in turn, donated it to the Saint John Mechanics' Institute.

Renamed the Mechanics' Institute Museum in 1846, an annual report dating from 1863 described it as, "a large and valuable collection of minerals, a great variety of zoological specimens, and many Chinese, Indian and other curiosities [that] frequently receives additions from foreign sea captains and others who get into their possession foreign articles of an attractive description."

When the Mechanics' Institute closed in 1890, the Natural History Society of New Brunswick acquired the collection and the museum was moved, first to the then new Market Building then, in 1906, to 72 Union Street. Under the care of its curator and later director, the entomologist Dr. William McIntosh, the museum's collections and activities expanded until a new building was essential. In 1934 a new provincial museum facility on Douglas Avenue was officially opened by Prime Minister R.B. Bennett.

As of 1942, the collections, building and properties of the museum officially became the property of the people of New Brunswick. Today a provincial institution funded by the Province of New Brunswick, the New Brunswick Museum continues to collect, preserve, study and exhibit the Province's natural and cultural heritage. As well as having a remarkable natural sciences collection, the museum has expanded to include one of the largest collections of 19th-century decorative arts and Canadiana in the Atlantic provinces.

Expansion

By 1992, the museum had outgrown its Douglas Avenue location, and plans were made to develop new exhibition galleries in a central Saint John location. The Collections Centre, the Archives and Research Library, and the Head Office continue to be situated at the Douglas Avenue location.

In 2017 it was announced by the New Brunswick government that a new centralized museum facility would be built in downtown (referred to locally as uptown) Saint John. The new building would have  combined the Douglas Avenue and Market Square facilities.  In December 2018 a newly-elected provincial government cancelled the project as a cost-cutting measure.

Affiliations
The museum is affiliated with the Canadian Museums Association, the Canadian Heritage Information Network, and the Virtual Museum of Canada.

References

External links

 New Brunswick Museum Includes searchable databases of the archives and research library, and natural sciences collections.
 "Early Museums in the Maritimes", Michael Deal, 2001

Museums in Saint John, New Brunswick
Art museums and galleries in New Brunswick
Natural history museums in Canada
Industry museums in Canada